Damascus Cover is a 2017 political thriller film, directed by Daniel Zelik Berk, from a screenplay by Berk and Samantha Newton. It is based upon the 1977 novel of the same name by Howard Kaplan. It stars Jonathan Rhys Meyers, Olivia Thirlby, Jürgen Prochnow, Igal Naor, Navid Negahban and John Hurt. This proved to be Hurt's final film appearance before his death. The film was dedicated to his memory.

The film had its world premiere at the Boston Film Festival on September 23, 2017. It was released on July 20, 2018, by Vertical Entertainment.

Plot

Ari Ben-Sion, an Israeli spy posing as a German businessman named Hans Hoffmann in Berlin in 1989, must get an Israeli spy out of Syria but realizes that he is part of a much bigger plan.

Cast
 Jonathan Rhys Meyers as Ari Ben-Sion / Hans Hoffmann
 Olivia Thirlby as Kim Johnson
 John Hurt as Miki
 Jürgen Prochnow as Franz Ludin
 Navid Negahban as Suleiman Sarraj
 Wolf Kahler as Colonel Ludwig Streicher
 Igal Naor as General Fuad
 Selva Rasalingam as Sabri
 Neta Riskin as Yael
 Tsahi Halevi as Rami Elon
 Ben Affan as Mustapha
 Herzl Tobey as Ehud
 Aki Avni as Shaul
 Hassani Shapi as Syrian Trade Minister
 Shani Aviv as Rachel

Production
In February 2015, it was announced Jonathan Rhys Meyers, John Hurt, Olivia Thirlby, Igal Naor, Jürgen Prochnow, and Navid Negahban joined the cast of the film, with Daniel Zelik Berk directing from a screenplay he wrote alongside Samantha Newton, from the novel of the same name by Howard Kaplan. Hannah Leader will serve as a producer on the film.

Release
The film had its world premiere at the Boston Film Festival on September 23, 2017. Shortly after, Vertical Entertainment acquired distribution rights to the film. The film was released on July 20, 2018.

Reception
On Rotten Tomatoes, the film holds an approval rating of 14% based on 22 reviews, and an average rating of 4.2/10. Metacritic gives it a weighted average score of 36 out of 100 based on reviews from 8 critics.

References

External links
 

2017 films
2017 action thriller films
2017 directorial debut films
2010s mystery thriller films
2010s political thriller films
American action thriller films
American mystery thriller films
American political thriller films
Films about the Mossad
Films based on American novels
Vertical Entertainment films
Israeli–Palestinian conflict films
Films set in Berlin
Films set in Damascus
Films set in Israel
Films set in Jerusalem
Films set in Syria
Films set in Tel Aviv
Films set in 1989
2010s American films